Electronic Attack Squadron 134 (VAQ-134) is an electronic warfare squadron of the United States Navy. It is nicknamed "Garudas" and is based at Naval Air Station Whidbey Island, Washington. The squadron is currently equipped with the Boeing EA-18G Growler.

Squadron History

1970s 
Electronic Attack Squadron (VAQ-134) was originally established on 7 June 1969 at Naval Air Station Alameda, California, flying the EKA-3B electronic warfare/tanker and KA-3B tanker Skywarriors.

In 1972, the squadron received the EA-6B Prowler and became the U.S. Navy's third operational Prowler squadron. 

In September 1977, the squadron received the newer Improved Capability (ICAP I) version of the EA-6B Prowler.

It was during this deployment that the squadron took part in the failed rescue attempt of American hostages in Iran. Late that year, the squadron celebrated 10 years of flying mishap free.

1980s 

Starting from September 1982, VAQ-134 would join Carrier Air Wing 15 (CVW-15) for 13 years. On 1 March 1983, the air wing and VAQ-134 deployed for the first cruise of the new Nimitz class carrier  around the world which lasted until 29 October. CVW-15 and VAQ-134 later make six more deployments on the Carl Vinson which included taking part in RIMPAC 84' and 86' as well as PACEX 89', the largest fleet exercise since World War II. 

Before PACEX 89' the squadron transitioned to ICAP II Prowler in early 1989 which allowed them to fire the AGM-88 HARM missile. Later during PACEX 89' they would become the first carrier-deployed Prowler squadron to fire one.

1990s 
After 1990, the squadron and CVW-15 moved to the older  between 1991 and 1994, they made three deployments. In 1991, the squadron won the "Top Hook" award for best landing grades during the cruise Kitty Hawk made when moving from Norfolk on the Atlantic side to San Diego on the Pacific side, dubbed the "Around the Horn" cruise.

In 1993, during operations as part of Operation Southern Watch, the squadron fired the AGM-88 HARM in combat for the first time. The last deployment with CVW-15 in June to December 1994 included passing through the Yellow Sea and Sea of Japan and Western Pacific as well as the KEEN EDGE, ANNUAL EX and TANDEM THRUST exercises. On the 17 December, the squadron celebrated yet another milestone passing 34,000 hours and 24 years without mishap before returning home on the 22nd.

On 31 March 1995, after 26 years of service, VAQ-134 was disestablished for the first time along with CVW-15. The squadron would, however, be recommissioned again, this being called upon to deploy to MCAS Iwakuni in Japan as the U.S. Air Force retired the EF-111A Raven. In 1999, the "Garudas" took part in Operation Allied Force against Serbia while stationed in Italy.

2000s and 2010s 
During 2003, the squadron moved to Incirlik Air Base in Turkey to take part in Operation Northern Watch. This, however, was short-lived as Operation Iraqi Freedom came about, in which the squadron took part.

In December 2010, VAQ-134 deployed on a carrier for the first time in 10 years while on board the Carl Vinson again.

This transition however came in 2016 and after this, VAQ-134 deployed to Pacific as an expeditionary squadron. In 2017, they took part in Exercise Red Flag at Nellis Air Force Base, Nevada, as well as being stationed at Misawa Air Base in Japan with the 35th Fighter Wing of the United States Air Force.

2020s 
In March 2022, six squadron aircraft were deployed to Spangdahlem Air Base, Germany, in support of NATO's air policing efforts in the wake of the 2022 Russian invasion of Ukraine.

Gallery

References

External links
VAQ-134 Official Website

See also
 History of the United States Navy
 List of United States Navy aircraft squadrons

Electronic attack squadrons of the United States Navy
Military units and formations in Washington (state)
Military units and formations disestablished in 1995
Military units and formations established in 1995
Military units and formations established in 1969